Piophilini is a tribe of small two-winged flies which includes the species known as the cheese fly.

Genera
Allopiophila Hendel, 1917
Mycetaulus Loew, 1845
Piophila Fallén, 1810
Prochyliza Walker, 1849
Protopiophila Duda, 1924
Pseudoseps Becker, 1902
Stearibia Lioy, 1864

References 

Piophilidae
Brachycera tribes